Nishanta Bordoloi (born 29  December 1977) is an Indian cricketer who played for Assam cricket team. He is a right-handed batsman who bowled right-arm offbreak.
Bordoloi made his first-class debut in the 1994/95 Ranji Trophy. He played 35 first-class matches and 29 List A matches for Assam. Currently Bordoloi is working as qualified Strength -Conditioning Coach and is rated to be amongst the best fitness coaches in the country, with over 30 Indian International Cricketers, over 100 first class cricketers, international Tennis players, footballers, an array of sports persons and celebrities in India & abroad training under him.  He is also an England & Wales cricket board qualified level -2 Cricket Coach and also specializes as a fielding Coach. He is the strength conditioning & Fielding Coach of the Delhi team and has been the  Fielding Coach of the Kings XI Punjab Team in the IPL.

Coaching career
He was appointed as Fielding Coach for Kings XI Punjab. In June 2018, he was appointed as the faculty member of BCCI's National Cricket Academy.

References

External links
 
 

1977 births
Living people
Indian cricketers
Assam cricketers
Cricketers from Guwahati